Luis Ramón "Yori Boy" Campas Medina (born August 6, 1971) is a Mexican former professional boxer who competed from 1987 to 2019. He held the IBF light middleweight title from 1997 to 1998.

Background
He is a native of Navojoa, Sonora, Mexico, where the word Yori means white. When he was young and he walked into a gym for the first time, the way he hit opponents that day impressed his trainers, Chava Mendoza and Gilbert Marquez. He began to be nicknamed Yori Boy, and few actually know his real name is Luis Ramon. He trained in Three Forks, Montana with his manager and trainer Joe Diaz.

Professional career
Campas, whose brother Armando was also a respected professional fighter, began his professional career on July 7, 1987 at the age of fifteen, by knocking out Gaby Vega in the first round at Ciudad Obregón, Sonora. His first thirteen fights were all won by knockout, and he built a record of 56-0 with 50 knockout wins by the time the IBF had him ranked as their number one world title challenger. Prior to that, he had won the Mexican and regional NABF welterweight titles. He won the NABF one on his first fight abroad, defeating Roger Turner by a twelve-round decision in Las Vegas, Nevada, on June 19, 1992.

Title fight against Trinidad
Campas also beat former world champion Jorge Vaca by a knockout in round two at Tijuana, before receiving his first world title fight, September 17 of 1994 against Félix Trinidad for the IBF welterweight title, as part of a Pay Per View undercard that featured Julio César Chávez's rematch against Meldrick Taylor for the WBC light welterweight title. Campas, who had been considered by many Mexicans to be the next Chávez, dropped Trinidad in round two, but he lost by a fourth-round technical knockout, for his first professional defeat in 57 bouts.

Campas came back with seven straight wins, including one that gave him the WBO's regional NABO welterweight title, when he knocked out former world champion Genaro Leon in three rounds, August 7 of 1995. On September 6, 1996, he was given a second world title try, against José Luis Lopez, for the WBO welterweight title, in Los Angeles, California. Campas lost by knockout in round six.

Capturing a world title
Campas then decided to campaign in the light middleweight division, beating Fidel Avendano by a knockout in round two in his first fight there. Campas had four straight wins before challenging for a world title again, this time against the IBF light middleweight champion Raul Marquez. On December 6, 1997, in Atlantic City, New Jersey, Campas became world champion by knocking out Marquez in round eight. He defended his title three times, beating Anthony Stephens by a knockout in three at Ledyard, Connecticut, Pedro Ortega by technical knockout in eleven at Tijuana, and former Trinidad opponent Larry Barnes by knockout in three in Las Vegas. On December 12 of 1998, however, he lost the title, after retiring in his corner in the seventh round against Fernando Vargas at Las Vegas.

After two wins in a row, he lost to Oba Carr. For his next fight, however, he became the first boxer to beat Tony Ayala, when Ayala was knocked out in round eight by Campas at San Antonio, Texas. On March 16 of 2002, he received his next world title shot, for the vacant WBO light middleweight title, against Puerto Rico's Daniel Santos, once again in Las Vegas. He lost by knockout in round eleven.

After one more knockout win, he tried to gain the WBC & WBA light middleweight titles against Oscar De La Hoya, on May 3, 2003, again, in Las Vegas. He lost that fight by knockout in round seven.

During a press conference held at Phoenix, Arizona, on March 24, 2004, Campas announced he had moved to that city.  Two days later, he returned to the ring after a ten-month layoff, defeating Dumont Dewey Welliver by a ten-round split decision. He followed his win over Welliver with an eight-round decision win over Raul Munoz, also in Phoenix. Campas then suffered a mild upset, when he was beaten by the relatively unknown Eric Regan by decision in twelve rounds, at Oroville, California.

His 2006 fight against Ireland's John Duddy was a candidate for the 2006 Fight of the Year.

100th career victory
On 30 March 2012 Campas reached a significant milestone when he chalked up the 100th win of his career via a 2nd-round knockout of Mauro Lucero. The win gave Campas his 79th win inside the distance and improved his overall record to 100-16-1.

Professional boxing record

Pay-per-view bouts

See also
List of IBF world champions
List of Mexican boxing world champions

References

External links
 

1971 births
Living people
Boxers from Sonora
People from Navojoa
Welterweight boxers
International Boxing Federation champions
Mexican male boxers